Austin Krajicek and César Ramírez won the title, beating Roberto Maytín and Andrés Molteni 6–3, 7–5

Seeds

Draw

Draw

References
 Main Draw

Seguros Bolivar Open Medellin - Doubles
2014 Doubles